Arts Tasmania is an agency of the Tasmanian State Government and is in the portfolio of the Tasmanian Minister for the Arts.  Arts Tasmania is within the Tasmanian Department of State Growth. It is the Tasmanian Government agency responsible for policy and planning for arts and culture in Tasmania.

The Minister for The Arts is Elise Archer MP and the Director is Dr David Sudmalis.

Background
The Tasmanian Arts Advisory Board (TAAB) was established to provide advice on policy and funding to the state government and was created by the Tasmanian Arts Advisory Board Act (1975) 

Arts Tasmania was created in 1991 as an umbrella term used by the Tasmanian State Government when referring to the Tasmanian Arts Advisory Board (TAAB), and the then Office of the Arts within the then Department of Education and the Arts.

Arts Tasmania has a similar function to other Australian state arts funding bodies and to the Australia Council for the Arts and that of other global arts councils, although it is unique to Tasmania. Arts Tasmania liaises with other Tasmanian Government agencies including the Tasmanian Museum and Art Gallery, the State Library of Tasmania and the Tasmanian Archives Office.

Funding programs
Primary to Arts Tasmania’s core programs, is to each year administer grants and loans to artists and arts organisations distributed under the Tasmanian Arts Advisory Board Act (TAAB) 1975. Currently, its funding programs include:
 
 Artist Investment Program
 Organisations Investment Program
 Low-interest Loans
 Aboriginal Arts Fund
 Small Museums and Collections Program

Arts Tasmania is also responsible for policy, planning, strategic development, and funding, of the arts and moveable cultural heritage in Tasmania.  Funding for screen based activities not handled by Arts Tasmania is made through a separate Tasmanian Government agency, Screen Tasmania (established in 1999).

Arts Tasmania has operational staff based in Hobart and Launceston.

Industry development
Arts Tasmania operates an industry development program which aims to increase the capacity of the arts sector and the viability of a career in the arts. Currently, its industry development programs include:

 arts-e newsbyte 
 Arts business and artform resources 
 COLLECT Art Purchase Scheme 
 Public art 
 Professional development 
 Tasmanian Arts Guide
 Tasmanian Literary Prizes

References

External links
Arts Tasmania website

Economy of Tasmania
Government agencies of Tasmania
Culture of Tasmania